Hafnium acetylacetonate, also known as Hf(acac)4, is a coordination compound with formula Hf(C5H7O2)4. This white solid is the main hafnium complex of acetylacetonate. The complex has a square antiprismatic geometry with eight nearly equivalent Hf-O bonds.  The molecular symmetry is D2, i.e., the complex is chiral. It is prepared from hafnium tetrachloride and acetylacetone, and base. Zr(acac)4 is very similar in structure and properties.

Uses
Along with titanium tetrabutoxide (TBT), hafnium acetylacetonate serves as a catalyst for the production of poly(butylene terephthalate).

Related compounds
Tetrakis(1,1,1-trifluoro-2,4-pentanedionato)hafnium

References

Hafnium compounds
Acetylacetonate complexes